The 1934–35 season was Arsenal's 16th consecutive season in the top division of English football. After the death of Herbert Chapman in January 1934, Joe Shaw had been designated as caretaker, but in the summer George Allison became full-time manager. 
In his debut season, he guided Arsenal to their third consecutive league title, with Arsenal finishing four points ahead of Sunderland and winning it at Middlesbrough. The Charity Shield was won at Highbury with a 4–0 victory over Manchester City, but the FA Cup run was ended by Sheffield Wednesday in the quarter-finals. During the season Arsenal had their highest ever Highbury attendance, with 73,295 witnessing a goalless draw against title rivals Sunderland. Ted Drake was top scorer with a club-record 42 goals from 41 league matches, thus topping the league scoring charts. In all competitions he made five more starts and scored two more goals. 
This season, Arsenal won 8-0 twice, against Leicester City and Middlesbrough, 7–0 against Wolves, 8–1 against Liverpool and 6–0 at rivals Tottenham.

Results
Arsenal's score comes first

Legend

Football League First Division

Final League table

FA Cup

See also

 1934–35 in English football
 List of Arsenal F.C. seasons

References

English football clubs 1934–35 season
1934-35
1934-35